This is a list of Southeastern Louisiana Lions football players in the NFL Draft.

Key

Selections

References

Southeastern Louisiana

Southeastern Louisiana Lions NFL Draft